The Puchar Ministra Obrony Narodowej is a bicycle race held in Masovian Voivodeship, Poland. It was first held in 1958 and since 2005, the race has been organised as a 1.2 event on the UCI Europe Tour.

Winners

External links

UCI Europe Tour races
Cycle races in Poland
Recurring sporting events established in 1958
1958 establishments in Poland